Trail Ridge Road is the name for the  stretch of U.S. Highway 34 that  traverses Rocky Mountain National Park from Estes Park, Colorado in the east to Grand Lake, Colorado in the west. Together with the connecting  Beaver Meadow Road (U.S. Highway 36), Trail Ridge Road forms the  Trail Ridge Road/Beaver Meadow National Scenic Byway, an All-American Road. With a high point at  elevation, Trail Ridge Road is the highest continuous paved road in North America. The higher portion of Trail Ridge Road is closed from October to May.

Route description

From Kawuneeche Visitor Center at the park's Grand Lake Entrance, Trail Ridge Road follows the North Fork of the Colorado River north through the Kawuneeche Valley. There are several trailheads along this section of the road, notably the Colorado River Trailhead, which is the western terminus of the road segment closed during the winter.

Near the highest point on the road is another pass, Iceberg Pass (elev. ).

According to construction contracts and park maintenance files the east end of the road is located at the Fall River Entrance, however some guides state that earlier - at Deer Ridge Junction.

Trail Ridge is a high flat spur range extending east from the main range of the Rockies between Fall River in the North and the Big Thompson River in the South. The road follows Trail Ridge from the Fall River Pass near Alpine Visitor Center to the Deer Ridge Junction.

History
Trail Ridge had been used by Native Americans to cross the mountains between their home lands  in the west and hunting areas on the east side. Arapahoe Indians called the trail located on the ridge as "taienbaa" ("Where the Children Walked") because it was so steep that children could not be carried, but had to walk. The Ute tribe crossing the mountains at Forest Canyon Pass marked their route with stone cairns. The present park Ute Trail follows partially that ancient route.

On the west side, about 1880, a wagon road was constructed along the Kawuneeche Valley from the town of Grand Lake to the mining camps of Lulu City and Gaskill. The camps were abandoned after a few years when short-lived mining boom ended and later the road was used only occasionally by hunters and tourists.

Fall River Road was the first road into the park's high country. It opened in 1921 and quickly proved inadequate for motor travel as a single-track road with steep grades (up to 16%), tight curves and a short annual season due to snowpack. Construction began in 1929 and was complete to Fall River Pass by July 1932, with a maximum grade of 7%. The road was complete through the Kawuneeche Valley to Grand Lake in 1938.  The route followed what was known to local Arapaho Indians as the Dog Trail. Internal opposition to the construction of a road through the park's alpine tundra was overruled by National Park Service director Horace Albright, who wished to encourage park visitation. The road was designed to intrude as little as possible into the landscape, in accordance with Park Service design principles.

Hidden Valley (or Ski Estes Park) was a local ski area attraction from 1955 - 1991, off of Trail Ridge Road, now defunct.

See also

National Register of Historic Places listings in Larimer County, Colorado

References

External links

Rocky Mountain National Park
Trail Ridge Road
Trail Ridge Road/Beaver Meadow Road Overview on the National Scenic Byways website
Trail Ridge Road on the Colorado Scenic Byways website

Colorado scenic drives
Transportation in Grand County, Colorado
Transportation in Larimer County, Colorado
All-American Roads
National Register of Historic Places in Rocky Mountain National Park
Toll roads in Colorado
U.S. Route 34
Roads on the National Register of Historic Places in Colorado
Estes Park, Colorado
Historic American Engineering Record in Colorado
National Register of Historic Places in Larimer County, Colorado